Pettis Creek is a stream in Barton County in the U.S. state of Missouri.

Pettis Creek derives its name from Allen Perry, a local judge.

See also
List of rivers of Missouri

References

Rivers of Barton County, Missouri
Rivers of Missouri